PRL may refer to:

Places
 Polish People's Republic (Polska Rzeczpospolita Ludowa), 1952–1989
 Punggol Regional Library, an upcoming regional library in Punggol, Singapore

Business and enterprises
 Penn Eastern Rail Lines, reporting mark

Computing and technology
 Preferred Roaming List, in CDMA phones
 Proportional reduction in loss, a measure of reliability
 Protocol-relative link, URLs which do not specify a protocol

Organizations
 Liberal Reformist Party (Dominican Republic)
 Parti Réformateur Libéral, a former political party in Belgium
 Party of the Radical Left (Partija radikalne levice), a political party in Serbia
 Republican Party of Liberty, a conservative political party in France, 1945–1951

Science and healthcare
 Physical Research Laboratory, India
 Physical Review Letters, a scientific journal
 PRL-8-53, Nootropic research chemical
 Prolactin, a hormone